Abel Cullum (born April 21, 1987 in Tucumcari, New Mexico) is an American professional mixed martial artist and former King of the Cage Flyweight Champion.

Mixed martial arts career

King of the Cage
Cullum made his debut for the King of the Cage promotion in November 2006.  In May 2008, he won the promotion's Flyweight (135 lbs) title and successfully defend the title four times over the next two years. He recently lost the title to Jimmie Rivera via split decision. Within the promotion he has posted a record of 8-1.

EliteXC 140lb Championship
Cullum agreed to step in for an injured Bao Quach and face Brazilian Wilson Reis for EliteXC's 140 lb Championship.  It was a highly acclaimed fight, with a lot of very advanced submission attempts and defenses from both fighters. However Abel was unable to overcome the larger Reis, losing the five-round match by unanimous decision.

DREAM
Cullum competed in the DREAM Featherweight Grand Prix. he defeated kickboxer Akiyo Nishiura via unanimous decision in the first round of the tournament. In the second round of the tournament he faced Hideo Tokoro who he lost to via rear naked choke.

Cullum faced Masakazu Imanari in the opening round of the DREAM Bantamweight Grand Prix at Dream 17 at the Saitama Super Arena in Saitama, Japan, on Sept. 24. He lost the bout via submission in the third round.

Resurrection Fighting Alliance
After nearly three years away from the sport, Cullum signed with the Resurrection Fighting Alliance promotion. Cullum faced UFC veteran Ulysses Gomez at RFA 18: Manzanares vs. Pantoja on September 12, 2014. He won the fight via first round guillotine choke.

Cullum made a quick return to the cage as he replaced an injured Jeff Curran to face Carl Deaton at RFA 19: Collier vs. Checco on October 10, 2014. He won the fight via submission in the second round.

Mixed martial arts record

|-
|Loss
|align=center|21–7
|Steve Garcia
|Decision (unanimous)
|JacksonWink Fight Night 4
|
|align=center|3
|align=center|5:00
|Albuquerque, New Mexico, United States
|
|-
| Win
| align=center| 21–6
| Joshua Montoya
| Submission (guillotine choke)
| JacksonWink Fight Night 3
| 
| align=center| 1
| align=center| 2:07
| Albuquerque, New Mexico, United States
| 
|-
| Win
| align=center| 20–6
| Carl Deaton 
| Submission (rear-naked choke)
| RFA 19: Collier vs. Checco
| 
| align=center| 2
| align=center| 3:43
| Prior Lake, Minnesota, United States
| 
|-
| Win
| align=center| 19–6
| Ulysses Gomez
| Submission (guillotine choke)
| RFA 18: Manzanares vs. Pantoja
| 
| align=center| 1
| align=center| 1:29
| Albuquerque, New Mexico, United States
| 
|-
| Loss
| align=center| 18–6
| Masakazu Imanari
| Submission (armbar)
| Dream 17
| 
| align=center| 3
| align=center| 0:46
| Saitama, Japan
| 
|-
| Loss
| align=center| 18–5
| Jared Papazian
| Decision (unanimous)
| KOTC: Epic Force
| 
| align=center| 5
| align=center| 5:00
| Thackerville, Oklahoma, United States
| 
|-
| Loss
| align=center| 18–4
| Jimmie Rivera
| Decision (split)
| KOTC: No Mercy
| 
| align=center| 5
| align=center| 5:00
| Mashantucket, Connecticut, United States
| 
|-
| Win
| align=center| 18–3
| Joshua Montoya
| Submission (rear-naked choke)
| KOTC: Honor
| 
| align=center| 1
| align=center| 1:38
| Mescalero, New Mexico, United States
| 
|-
| Win
| align=center| 17–3
| Joe Coca
| Submission (kimura)
| KOTC: Vengeance
| 
| align=center| 1
| align=center| 2:09
| Mescalero, New Mexico, United States
| 
|-
| Win
| align=center| 16–3
| Richard Montano
| Decision (unanimous)
| KOTC: Gate Keeper
| 
| align=center| 5
| align=center| 5:00
| Mescalero, New Mexico, United States
| 
|-
| Loss
| align=center| 15–3
| Hideo Tokoro
| Submission (rear-naked choke)
| Dream 9
| 
| align=center| 2
| align=center| 1:38
| Yokohama, Japan
| 
|-
| Win
| align=center| 15–2
| Akiyo Nishiura
| Decision (unanimous)
| Dream 7
| 
| align=center| 2
| align=center| 5:00
| Saitama, Japan
| 
|-
| Win
| align=center| 14–2
| Brett Roller
| Submission (rear-naked choke)
| KOTC: Goodfellas
| 
| align=center| 1
| align=center| 1:47
| Albuquerque, New Mexico, United States
| 
|-
| Loss
| align=center| 13–2
| Wilson Reis
| Decision (unanimous)
| ShoXC: Elite Challenger Series
| 
| align=center| 5
| align=center| 5:00
| Santa Ynez, California, United States
| 
|-
| Win
| align=center| 13–1
| Ryan Diaz
| Submission (armbar)
| KOTC: Reckless
| 
| align=center| 5
| align=center| 1:27
| Greenville, Missouri, United States
| 
|-
| Win
| align=center| 12–1
| Zach Jenkins
| Submission (rear naked choke)
| KOTC: Warlords
| 
| align=center| 1
| align=center| N/A 
| Towaoc, Colorado, United States
| 
|-
| Win
| align=center| 11–1
| Eddie Armendariz
| KO (punch)
| KOTC: Hierarchy
| 
| align=center| 1
| align=center| 1:17 
| Albuquerque, New Mexico, United States
| 
|-
| Win
| align=center| 10–1
| Jasper Church
| TKO
| DE: Clash of the Titans
| 
| align=center| 1
| align=center| 1:23
| New Mexico, United States
| 
|-
| Win
| align=center| 9–1
| Gerald Sedillo
| Submission (rear-naked choke)
| Southwest Fury
| 
| align=center| 1
| align=center| 2:42
| Sunland Park, New Mexico, United States
| 
|-
| Win
| align=center| 8–1
| John Chester
| Submission (rear-naked choke)
| KOTC: Cyclone
| 
| align=center| 2
| align=center| 1:27 
| Tulsa, Oklahoma, United States
| 
|-
| Win
| align=center| 7–1
| Alfredo Herrea
| Submission (armbar)
| Universal Fight Promotions
| 
| align=center| 2
| align=center| 2:04
| Alamogordo, New Mexico, United States
| 
|-
| Win
| align=center| 6–1
| Jeremy Ramage
| TKO (soccer kicks and punches)
| DE: Tucumcari Pride
| 
| align=center| 1
| align=center| 1:14
| New Mexico, United States
| 
|-
| Win
| align=center| 5–1
| Gabe Brockmier
| TKO
| DE: Total Chaos
| 
| align=center| 1
| align=center| 0:36
| New Mexico, United States
| 
|-
| Win
| align=center| 4–1
| Joel Garvin
| Submission (triangle choke) 
| DE: Thursday Throwdown
| 
| align=center| 1
| align=center| N/A 
| New Mexico, United States
| 
|-
| Win
| align=center| 3–1
| Thomas Urquides
| Submission (triangle choke)
| DE: Socorro
| 
| align=center| 1
| align=center| 3:41
| New Mexico, United States
| 
|-
| Win
| align=center| 2–1
| Sammy Saenz
| KO (punch) 
| DE: Tribal Nation
| 
| align=center| 1
| align=center| N/A 
| New Mexico, United States
| 
|-
| Loss
| align=center| 1–1
| Richard Montano
| Decision (unanimous)
| DE: Socorro Showdown
| 
| align=center| 2
| align=center| 5:00
| New Mexico, United States
| 
|-
| Win
| align=center| 1–0
| Michael Chupa
| Submission (rear-naked choke)
| DE: Beyond Brutal
| 
| align=center| 1
| align=center| 1:26
| New Mexico, United States
|

References

External links

Abel Cullum's ProElite page
MMA Universe's Fight Finder

1987 births
Living people
American male mixed martial artists
Bantamweight mixed martial artists
Mixed martial artists from New Mexico
People from Tucumcari, New Mexico
Sportspeople from New Mexico